Amplypterus is a genus of moths in the family Sphingidae. The genus was erected by Jacob Hübner in 1819.

Species
Amplypterus celebensis (Rothschild & Jordan, 1906)
Amplypterus mansoni (Clark 1924)
Amplypterus mindanaoensis Inoue, 1996
Amplypterus panopus (Cramer 1779)
Amplypterus sumbawanensis (Eitschberger, 2006)

References

 
Ambulycini
Moth genera
Taxa named by Jacob Hübner